Sukhbir Singh Kapoor OBE (Punjabi: ਸੁਖਬੀਰ ਸਿੰਘ ਕਪੂਰ) is a writer and educator. Currently the vice chancellor of The International School of Sikh Studies and Khalsa College, London, Kapoor has served as a professor and administrator at universities in several countries. He has written 50 books on various topics, including Sikhism, economic theory, business administration, accounting practice, and Punjabi poetry. His numerous articles have appeared in many English and Punjabi magazines, and he has received numerous awards, including the Punjabi Academy Award from the Government of Delhi. He has also organized many symposia for drama and poetry, and has directed many plays. Kapoor is the chief editor of the Sikh Courier International. Kapoor was appointed Officer of the Order of the British Empire (OBE) in the 2010 Birthday Honors.

Education
He studied at the Universities of Punjab, Agra, Glasgow, and London. His academic and professional achievements include qualifications of D.Litt., PhD, MCom, M.A. (law), BCom (hons), LL.B., FCMA, and FCCA. He received military training as a cadet at Kamti for NCC, where he was commissioned as an officer.

Early career
In his early career, he was professor and head of accounting at Sri Guru Tech Bahadur Khalsa College Delhi, University of Delhi, and principal lecturer in accounting at London Guildhall University. Later, he became a guest professor of Sikhism at the Faculty for Comparative Religion in Antwerp, Belgium.

Later career
Kapoor is currently vice chancellor of The International School of Sikh Studies and Khalsa College London.

Books
All books written by Kapoor are in English. Guru-bani text, where relevant, is both in Punjabi and English.

References and notes

External links
 Dr Sukhbir Singh Kapoor
 Khalsa College London 
 The International School of Sikh Studies

Indian Sikhs
British Sikhs
Officers of the Order of the British Empire
Punjabi people
Living people
Indian emigrants to England
Naturalised citizens of the United Kingdom
Indian accountants
British accountants
Year of birth missing (living people)